Sankt Martin is a municipality in Südliche Weinstraße district, in Rhineland-Palatinate, Germany.

Buildings 
The medieval center is worth seeing and is since 1980 under Cultural heritage management.
St. Martin, Martin of Tours, is also the patron of  Catholic parish church of St. Martin. In addition to a  Late Gothic net vault in  choir, there are other art treasures of Gothic sculpture, such as the tomb of Hanns von Dalberg († 1531) and his wife Catherine von Cronberg. (UNESCO - plaque).

References

External links
 Museum of Local History (Virtuelles Heimatmuseum Sankt Martin - Pfalz)

Municipalities in Rhineland-Palatinate